Starry Lee Wai-king, SBS, JP (born 13 March 1974 in British Hong Kong) is a Hong Kong politician, chairperson of the largest pro-establishment Beijing-loyalist party, the Democratic Alliance for the Betterment and Progress of Hong Kong (DAB). She is a member of the Standing Committee of the National People's Congress (NPCSC), Legislative Councillor for the Kowloon Central geographical constituency, and a Kowloon City District Councillor.  From 2012 to 2016, she was a member of the Executive Council.

Biography
Born in 1974 in Hong Kong into a working-class family and brought up on a public housing estate, Lee obtained her Bachelor of Business Administration from the Hong Kong University of Science and Technology and Master of Business Administration from the University of Manchester. She became a professional accountant, working for KPMG in Hong Kong and is currently the principal at CCIF CPA Ltd.

Lee first stood in the District Council elections in 1999 for the Kowloon City District Council, the neighbourhood where she lived. She was elected aged 26, the youngest district councillor at that time. She joined the pro-Beijing Democratic Alliance for the Betterment of Hong Kong when she was approached by the former party chairman Tsang Yok-sing around 2004. She was asked to become the part of Tsang's team in the following Legislative Council election in September 2004. She was listed third on the candidate list and helped Tsang to win a seat in the Kowloon West.

With her professional background, Lee became a new star in the party and also the pro-Beijing camp. She was elected to the Legislative Council with around 39,000 votes, nearly 19 percent of the vote share, when Tsang left the constituency for Hong Kong Island in the 2008 Legislative Council election. In 2011, she was elected as the vice-chairwoman of the party.

In 2012, she was appointed to the Executive Council by Chief Executive Leung Chun-ying. At the time, she was the only person to hold positions in three different levels of representative councils, the Executive, Legislative and District Councils. She served on the Executive Council until her resignation in March 2016, when she said she wanted to focus on her work on the Legislative Council and the party. Her position was taken by Ip Kwok-him, a veteran DAB legislator.

In the 2012 Legislative Council election, Lee contested in the newly created territory-wide District Council (Second) "super seats". Her ticket received over 270,000 votes in total. On 17 April 2015, she was elected as the first woman to chair the DAB, succeeding Tam Yiu-chung.

After Lee was re-elected in the 2016 Legislative Council election, she succeeded Andrew Leung of the Business and Professionals Alliance for Hong Kong (BPA) to become the chairperson of the Legislative Council House Committee, the second highest office in the legislature. In 2018, she was invited to sit on the 13th National Committee of the Chinese People's Political Consultative Conference (CPPCC).

On 18 May 2020, Lee was re-elected as House Committee chairperson. Prior to the vote, Chan Kin-por, the nominee of Legislative Council president Andrew Leung, had taken the seat of the presiding member – a position which had been held since October 2019 by pro-democrat Dennis Kwok – with the help of security personnel, and 15 pro-democratic lawmakers had been removed from the meeting room after scuffles had broken out; during Lee's election, three pro-democrats sat outside the room in protest.  After the physical removal of the pro-democratic lawmakers, Lee was elected.  

In March 2021, Lee supported changes that would reduce the power of Legislative Council members, claiming that opposition members had blocked legislation and caused a power vacuum.

In October 2021, Lee and fellow lawmaker Holden Chow were criticized by the mother of Amber Poon, claiming that Lee and Chow were "vanishing" after holding a press conference in 2019 with her, to push forward the 2019 Hong Kong extradition bill.

During the 2021 Hong Kong legislative election, Lee dismissed concerns that the record-low voter turnout of 30.2% was problematic.

In January 2022, the mainland Chinese national emblem was permanently added to the Legislative Council chamber, after Andrew Leung, Starry Lee Wai-king and Ma Fung-kwok decided that it should be made permanent. Andrew Leung had earlier said it would be only temporary for the swearing in of lawmakers.

In February 2022, Lee told SCMP that she would not be attending the 2022 Two Sessions, as a Hong Kong delegate.

In August 2022, Lee announced that 16 members of the DAB would travel overseas to clarify any "misunderstandings" businesspeople may have about Hong Kong.

In November 2022, after a rugby match in South Korea played Glory to Hong Kong for the Hong Kong team, Lee said that Asia Rugby should apologize to "the entire [Chinese] population."

On 11 March 2023, Lee was elected to the National People's Congress and succeeded Tam Yiu-chung to become the Hong Kong representative in the NPCSC.

Personal life 
Lee is married and has a daughter. In November 2022, she was tested positive for COVID-19.

See also
 District Council (Second)

References

External links

Official Website of Starry Lee
HK Legislative Council - Members' Biographies

1974 births
Living people
21st-century Hong Kong women politicians
Alumni of the Hong Kong University of Science and Technology
Alumni of the University of Manchester
Delegates to the 14th National People's Congress from Hong Kong
Democratic Alliance for the Betterment and Progress of Hong Kong politicians
District councillors of Kowloon City District
HK LegCo Members 2008–2012
HK LegCo Members 2012–2016
HK LegCo Members 2016–2021
HK LegCo Members 2022–2025
Hong Kong accountants
Members of the National Committee of the Chinese People's Political Consultative Conference